Chahar Zabar or Chehar Zabar may refer to:
 Chahar Zabar-e Olya
 Chahar Zabar-e Sofla